A revenue service, revenue agency or taxation authority is a government agency responsible for the intake of government revenue, including taxes and sometimes non-tax revenue. Depending on the jurisdiction, revenue services may be charged with tax collection, investigation of tax evasion, or carrying out audits.

In certain instances, they also administer payments to certain relevant individuals (such as statutory sick pay, statutory maternity pay) as well as  targeted financial support (welfare) to families and individuals (through payment of tax credits or transfer payments).

The chief executive of the revenue agency is usually styled as Commissioner, Minister, Secretary or Director.

Revenue services by jurisdiction

References

 
Government agencies by type